Fletchamstead is an area of Coventry. It has a church, a pub and a business park.

References

Suburbs of Coventry